Yvonne van Langen-Wisse (born 6 June 1982 in Vlissingen) is a Dutch heptathlete, who has won thirteen national titles in six different events, including a silver medal at the 2003 European U23 Championships.

Achievements

References

1982 births
Living people
Dutch heptathletes
Sportspeople from Vlissingen
Competitors at the 2003 Summer Universiade
Competitors at the 2005 Summer Universiade